Mohammad Reza Tupchi  (Persian:محمدرضا توپچی born 7 January 1963) is an Iranian wrestler. He competed in the men's freestyle 90 kg at the 1988 Summer Olympics. He also won three gold medal at the  Asian Wrestling Championships in 1988, 1989, and 1991.

He has two Pahlevani armbands in (1987-1989) and one of them was given to him by the Supreme Leader of Iran.

References

External links
 

1963 births
Living people
Iranian male sport wrestlers
Olympic wrestlers of Iran
Wrestlers at the 1988 Summer Olympics
Asian Wrestling Championships medalists
Place of birth missing (living people)
20th-century Iranian people
21st-century Iranian people